Arnold Van Opstal is a Filipino-German professional basketball player who last played for the GlobalPort Batang Pier of the Philippine Basketball Association (PBA). He has also played as part of the Philippine national basketball team in international competitions. Van Opstal played for the De La Salle University in the collegiate-level.

Early life
Arnold Van Opstal was born in December 15, 1991 Germany. He was born to Heinz, a German who was the former PAL general manager of Europe and Luzviminda Llantero who works at the Department of Foreign Affairs as head of the Machine Readable Passport Personalization Center of the Office of Consular Affairs. Van Opstal also has a brother named Christopher who is a lawyer by the age of 23 and a graduate of the University of Technology Sydney.

Arnold Van Opstal studied at De La Salle Zobel from kindergarten to Grade 1 before relocating abroad with his family. His family resided in various places abroad such as in Bonn in Germany, The Hague in the Netherlands, Berlin, and then to Sydney, Australia due to his mother's foreign postings. In 2007, a year after Van Opstal's father died, his family moved backed to Manila after his mother received a Philippine-based assignment.

He re-enrolled in De La Salle Zobel as a high school student and later enrolled at De La Salle University for his collegiate studies to pursue a degree in International Studies.

High school career
Van Opstal was scouted by Jack Rodriguez who was a former La Salle varsity player who encouraged him to re-enroll at De La Salle Zobel. Van Opstal managed to earn a place for the school's junior varsity team for the 2008-09 season and was supposed to be named Rookie of the Year but was disqualified after he was ejected for retaliating during a game against the University of Santo Tomas. He spent a year-off from basketball to finish his studies at Zobel due to the non-honoring of his Australian credits.

College career
Van Opstal played for the De La Salle Green Archers while in college. However, in July 2015, he opted his remaining playing year with the Green Archers due to a recurring Achilles' heel injury. He was a key player when the Green Archers won the UAAP title in 2013.

Professional career
Van Opstal played at the PBA D-League while still playing with De La Salle. He played for the Hapee Fresh Fighters at the 2014–15 PBA D-League Aspirant's Cup but was later relegated to the reserve list by due to injuries. In May 2015, he signed to Cebuana Lhuillier Gems and left Hapee. He played in five games for Cebuana.

He then went to various places such as England and Thailand to regain form. He also trained in the United States in March 2016. He was part of squad that participated at the 2016 FIBA Asia Challenge.

International career
After recovering from an Achilles' heel injury in August 2016, Van Opstal expressed his commitment to play for the Philippine national basketball team. He was part of the squad that participated at the 2016 FIBA Asia Challenge.

References

1991 births
Living people
German men's basketball players
German sportspeople of Filipino descent
Citizens of the Philippines through descent
NorthPort Batang Pier players
Philippine Basketball Association All-Stars
Philippines men's national basketball team players
Filipino men's basketball players
San Miguel Beermen players
De La Salle Green Archers basketball players
Centers (basketball)
San Miguel Beermen draft picks